Tenderloin is a  1928 American part-talkie crime film directed by Michael Curtiz and starring Dolores Costello. While the film was a part-talkie, it was mostly a silent film with a synchronized musical score and sound effects on Vitaphone discs. It was produced and released by Warner Bros. Tenderloin is considered a lost film, with no prints currently known to exist.

Plot
Rose Shannon (Dolores Costello), a dancing girl at "Kelly's," in the "Tenderloin" district of New York City, worships at a distance Chuck White (Conrad Nagel), a younger member of the gang that uses it as their hangout. Chuck's interest in her is as just another toy to play with. Rose is implicated in a crime which she knows nothing about. The police pick her up, and the gang sends Chuck to take care of her in the event she may know or disclose something that will implicate the gang.

Cast

 Dolores Costello as Rose Shannon
 Conrad Nagel as Chuck White
 George E. Stone as "Sparrow"
 Mitchell Lewis as The professor
 Dan Wolheim as "Lefty"
 Pat Hartigan as "The Mug"
 Fred Kelsey as Detective Simpson
 G. Raymond Nye as Cowles
 Evelyn Pierce as Bobbie
 Dorothy Vernon as Aunt Molly
 John Miljan as bank teller

Premiere Vitaphone short subjects
Tenderloin premiered at the Warners' Theatre in New York City on March 14, 1928.

Production
Tenderloin was the second Vitaphone feature with talking sequences that Warner Bros. released, five months after The Jazz Singer. The film contained 15 minutes of spoken dialog, and Warners promoted it as the first film in which actors actually spoke their roles. Reportedly, at the film's premiere, the feature was met with derisive laughter as a result of the film's stilted dialogue, resulting in two of the four talking sequences being eliminated during the first week of the film's premiere run.  Critic Harriette Underhill wrote that the "screen talking devices give the characters a certain lisp, slightly detracts from the serious effect."

Box Office
According to Warner Bros records the film earned $889,000 domestically and $96,000 foreign.

See also
List of lost films
List of early Warner Bros. talking features

References

Further reading
Hall, Mordaunt (March 15, 1928) "A Film with Dialogue" (review) The New York Times

External links

 

Tenderloin Vitaphone soundtrack disk reel 1 at SoundCloud

1928 films
Films directed by Michael Curtiz
1928 crime films
American black-and-white films
Lost American films
Warner Bros. films
Films produced by Darryl F. Zanuck
American crime films
Transitional sound films
1928 lost films
Lost crime films
1920s English-language films
1920s American films